Diplomatic relations between Argentina and Venezuela, have existed for decades. 

Argentina counts with an embassy in Caracas and Venezuela counts with an embassy in Buenos Aires.

History 

US$1.4 billion was traded between Argentina and Venezuela during 2008. 

Venezuelan President Hugo Chávez met Argentine President Cristina Fernández de Kirchner in Caracas on 11 August 2009. Kirchner called it a "bilateral meeting [...] aimed at deepening our vital integration." 

The two presidents signed deals intended to see Venezuela import leather, machinery and poultry from Argentina, whilst a rice importation agreement was described by the Argentine President as "the biggest ever in Argentina's history". The deals were said to be worth $1.1 billion. The meeting coincided with visits to Venezuela by dozens of Argentine businessmen.

Migration

During the 1970s and 1980s, a sizeable number of Argentines migrated to Venezuela, escaping the military dictatorship and the country's economic woes. Many of them later returned to Argentina on the onset of the Venezuelan economic crisis.

As a result of the Venezuelan crisis, millions of Venezuelans have fled their country, and many of them have settled in Argentina. As of 2021, there are 179,203 Venezuelans living in Argentina, most of whom migrated during the latter half of the 2010s. As of 2018, Venezuelans were the fourth-largest expat community in Argentina, behind Paraguayans, Bolivians and Chileans. According to IOM figures, Argentina granted 170,223 residency permits to Venezuelan citizens alone from 2018 to 2020, nearly twice as many as to Paraguayan citizens. This makes Venezuelans the fastest-growing expat community in the country.

See also 
 Venezuelan Argentines
 Gran Gasoducto del Sur
 Suitcase scandal

References 

 
Venezuela
Argentina